RWJ may refer to:

 Ray William Johnson (born 1981), American actor and comedian
 Robert Wood Johnson, the name shared by members of the family that descended from the president of Johnson & Johnson
 Robert Wood Johnson I (1845–1910), American entrepreneur and industrialist and one of the three founding brothers of Johnson & Johnson
 Robert Wood Johnson II (1893–1968), American businessman
 Robert Wood Johnson III (1920–1970), American philanthropist and businessman
 Woody Johnson (Robert Wood Johnson IV, born 1947), American businessman and philanthropist
 Robert Wood Johnson Foundation, the United States' largest philanthropy devoted exclusively to health and health care
 Robert Wood Johnson Medical School, a medical school whose stated purpose is education, research, health care delivery, and the promotion of community health
 Robert Wood Johnson University Hospital, central New Jersey's Only Level 1 Trauma and academic medical center
 Robert Ward Johnson, Democratic United States Senator and Confederate States Senator from the state of Arkansas
 Royce Wood Junior, British singer-songwriter
 RWJ Airpark, a public-use airport located in Beach City, Chambers County, Texas, United States
 RWJ-394674, a potent, orally active analgesic drug, which produces little respiratory depression
 RWJ-51204,  is an anxiolytic drug used in scientific research.